Alireza Alavitabar (born 1960) is an Iranian political scientist and a leading reformist intellectual and writer.

He holds a doctorate in political sciences and is a member of the Institute for Planning and Development's faculty.

Alavitabar is a member of Islamic Iran Participation Front and was the editor of the now closed Sobh-e-Emrooz newspaper.

In the 1990s, Alireza Alavitabar rose to prominence as a result of his journalistic work and reflections on the politics of the Second Khordad Reform Movement during Khatami's presidency.

Publications/Works
Editorial roles:
 Bahman, 1996
 Rah -e no, 1998
 Sobh-e-Emrooz, 1999

References

External links
 Reporters Without Borders Annual Report 2004 - Iran
 Alireza Alavitabar's list of publications

Iranian political scientists
Iranian journalists
Iranian writers
Islamic Iran Participation Front politicians
Living people
1960 births